John Warburton (June 18, 1903 – October 27, 1981) was a British actor who appeared in numerous Hollywood films in the 1930s to 1960s.

Biography
Born in Drogheda, Ireland, Warburton studied for the ministry at Oxford University and served in the British military beginning in 1916. He came to the United States as a stowaway on a freighter and began acting on stage in New York.

On Broadway, Warburton portrayed Cyril Beverley in Bird in Hand (1930). His film career began with RKO's Secrets of the French Police (1932). His work on television included performing on 35 episodes of Fireside Theater. He also guest starred in television series such as Perry Mason and the Star Trek episode "Balance of Terror".

In 1933, Warburton was in the center of legal trouble in Los Angeles. A grand jury indicted two men for beating and robbing Warburton in revenge for his alleged beating of actress Alice White. She testified that an argument at a party led to Warburton's battery, which resulted in her spending four days in bed to recover.

Personal life
Among Warburton's five wives were Ruth Selwyn and Lucille Morrison.

Death
He died of cancer in Sherman Oaks, California at age 78.

Selected filmography

The Silver Lining (1932) - Larry Clark
Secrets of the French Police (1932) - Leon Renault
Cavalcade (1933) - Edward Marryot
Love Is Dangerous (1933) - Steve
A Study in Scarlet (1933) - John Stanford
Blind Adventure (1933) - Reggie
Charlie Chan's Greatest Case (1933) - John Quincy Winterslip
 Love Is Dangerous (1933) - Steve
Let's Talk It Over (1934) - Alex Winters
Dizzy Dames (1935) - Rodney Stokes
Becky Sharp (1935) - Beau Brummel (uncredited)
Partners of the Plains (1938) - Ronald Harwood
The Sisters (1938) - Anthony Bittick
Captain Fury (1939) - Bob
The White Cliffs of Dover (1944) - Reggie Ashwood
Marriage Is a Private Affair (1944) - Chris (uncredited)
Nothing but Trouble (1944) - Ronetz
The Valley of Decision (1945) - Giles
Dangerous Partners (1945) - Clyde Ballister
Confidential Agent (1945) - Neil Forbes
Saratoga Trunk (1945) - Bartholomew Van Steed
Tarzan and the Huntress (1947) - Carl Marley
Living in a Big Way (1947) - 'Skippy' Stuart Simms
Bronco Buster (1952) - Crawford (uncredited)
City Beneath the Sea (1953) - Captain Clive
East of Sumatra (1953) - Gregory Keith
The Royal African Rifles (1953) - Col. Burke
Headline Hunters (1955) - Harvey S. Kevin
The Mating Game (1956) - Marshall (uncredited)
From the Terrace (1960) - Partner (uncredited)
Secret File: Hollywood (1962) - Jimmy Cameron
King Rat (1965) - The Commandant
Assault on a Queen (1966) - Bank Manager
Funny Girl (1968) - Card Player (uncredited)
Nighthawks (1978) - (final film role)

References

External links

John Warburton at Memory Alpha (a Star Trek wiki)

British male film actors
British male television actors
British emigrants to the United States
British expatriate male actors in the United States
20th-century British male actors
1903 births
1981 deaths